The American Journal of Nursing (AJN) is a monthly peer-reviewed nursing journal established in 1900.  the editor-in-chief was Maureen Shawn Kennedy and it is published by Lippincott Williams & Wilkins. In 2009 the journal was selected as one of the "100 Most Influential Journals in Biology and Medicine in the Last 100 Years" by the Biomedical and Life Sciences Division of the Special Libraries Association.

History
The American Journal of Nursing was established in 1900 as its official journal by the Associated Alumnae of Trained Nurses of the United States which later became the American Nurses Association (ANA). Isabel Hampton Robb, Lavinia Dock, Mary E. P. Davis and Sophia Palmer are credited with founding the journal, the latter serving as the first editor. Other editors have included Mary May Roberts (1921–1949), Nell V. Beeby (1949–1956), Jeanette V. White (1956–1957), Edith P. Lewis (1957–1959), Barbara G. Schutt (1959–1971), Thelma M. Schorr (1971–1981), Mary B. Mallison (1981–1993), Lucille A. Joel (1993–1998), Diana J. Mason (1998–2009) and Maureen S. Kennedy (2009–present)  The journal was originally published by J. B. Lippincott & Co. In 1996 Lippincott Williams & Wilkins purchased the journal from the ANA of which it ceased to be the official journal, to the disappointment of then editor Mason.

Abstracting and indexing
The journal is abstracted and indexed in:

According to the Journal Citation Reports, the journal has a 2017 impact factor of 1.389.

References

Further reading

External links

General nursing journals
Monthly journals
Lippincott Williams & Wilkins academic journals
English-language journals
Publications established in 1900